Michael John Andrew  is an Australian management consultant and former global chairman and CEO of KPMG.
 
Andrew has served on the International Advisory Board for the Moscow International Financial Centre, the International Business Council of the World Economic Forum, the Business Council of Australia, and the Steering Committee of the United Nations Global Compact for the environment.

In January 2016, Andrew was appointed an Officer of the Order of Australia for distinguished service to the accountancy profession at the national and international level, and to a range of business, anti-corruption, finance and community organisations.

References

Australian chief executives
Living people
KPMG people
Officers of the Order of Australia
Year of birth missing (living people)